Damani Ralph (born 6 November 1980) is a Jamaican retired footballer who played as a forward. His professional career spanned five years, two with Chicago Fire S.C. (2003–2004) and three with FC Rubin Kazan (2005–2007). He also earned 18 caps with the Jamaica national football team from 2002 to 2005. He has been a Licensed FIFA player agent with ICM Stellar Sports since 2011 and is currently its vice president of soccer in North America.

Early life and career
Ralph began playing football as a boy in Jamaica.  This included time with Harbour View and St. George's College before moving to the United States. Ralph began his career in America playing college soccer at Meridian Community College in Meridian, Mississippi, where he scored 59 goals in 45 games and was named MVP of the NJCAA Tournament. After two years with Meridian, Ralph left for the University of Connecticut, where he continued his dominant play. During his two years at Connecticut he scored 28 goals and added 11 assists, and was a Hermann Trophy finalist his senior year.

Professional

Major League Soccer

Ralph was drafted 18th overall by the Chicago Fire in the 2003 MLS SuperDraft. He quickly earned a spot in the starting lineup, and finished the season with 11 goals and 6 assists in 25 games. In scoring 11 goals, Ralph broke the MLS record for goals scored by a rookie, previously held by Rodrigo Faria, Josh Wolff, and Jeff Cunningham, and was named MLS Rookie of the Year for his accomplishments. In his second year with the Fire, he scored 11 goals again and added 3 assists to lead the team in scoring.  Ralph scored the game-winning goal in the 2003 Lamar Hunt U.S. Open Cup final to win the Fire their third U.S. Open Cup.

Europe

Ralph actively pursued a move to Europe almost from his first day in Chicago. Some of the clubs reported as interested in Ralph included British clubs Sunderland and Bolton.  In 2004, there were rumors that Ralph would move to the Spanish club Malaga, but MLS turned down a reputed $1 million (U.S.) transfer offer.  However, in 2005 Ralph finally secured his long desired transfer to Europe. The move was for undisclosed terms - thought to be $2 million (U.S.) - to Russian Club FC Rubin Kazan. The contract would run for three years with a starting yearly salary of $650,000.

In his first season for Rubin, he scored only twice in 25 league games as his team gained a fourth-place finish.

Injury and retirement
In February 2006, before the new Russian season started, Ralph had surgery in Germany to repair damage to his left knee. Later that year he was treated for a second time and he was sidelined for over 2.5 years after undergoing a third consecutive knee operation at the start of 2008.

Attempted Return to MLS
After almost three years out of professional football due to injury, during which he finished his economics degree at the University of Connecticut, Ralph reappeared on trial with Major League Soccer club New York Red Bulls during their 2010 pre-season. The trial ended without a contract offer from the club.

International career
Ralph struggled to cement a starting place on the Jamaica national team, largely because of competition from a number of naturalized Jamaican forwards from England. He made his debut in an August 2002 friendly match against Grenada and earned 18 caps, scoring once. He played in 8 FIFA World Cup qualification matches.

His final international was an October 2005 friendly against Australia.

Career statistics

Club

Honors

Club
Chicago Fire
Supporters' Shield: 2003
Lamar Hunt U.S. Open Cup: 2003

Rubin Kazan
La Manga Cup (2): 2005, 2006

Individual
MLS Rookie of the Year: 2003
MLS Goal of the Year Award: 2003

References

External links

1980 births
Living people
Association football forwards
Jamaican footballers
University of Connecticut alumni
Harbour View F.C. players
UConn Huskies men's soccer players
Chicago Fire FC players
FC Rubin Kazan players
Major League Soccer All-Stars
Major League Soccer players
Chicago Fire FC draft picks
Russian Premier League players
Jamaica international footballers
2005 CONCACAF Gold Cup players
Jamaican expatriate footballers
Jamaican expatriate sportspeople in the United States
Jamaican expatriate sportspeople in Russia
Expatriate soccer players in the United States
Expatriate footballers in Russia